First Nations Transportation was a Canadian freight airline from Gimli, Manitoba.

History
Founded in 2003, it offered freight services to remote communities in Manitiba. It ceased operations in April 2009 laying off staff of 20 after their operating license was suspended by Transport Canada for safety and other violations.

Destinations
The transport company served eight First Nations communities on the east side of Lake Winnipeg including St. Theresa Point, Manitoba and Garden Hill, Manitoba.

Fleet
The company operated a fleet of two Curtiss C-46 and two Douglas C-47.

See also 
 List of defunct airlines of Canada

References

External links

 Official website (offline)
 Director of all Canada airlines (current,defunct and future)

Defunct airlines of Canada
Regional airlines of Manitoba
2003 establishments in Manitoba
2009 disestablishments in Manitoba